North Korea–Vietnam relations is a bilateral relationship between Vietnam and North Korea.
North Korea and the former country North Vietnam established formal diplomatic relations on January 31, 1950. In July 1957, North Vietnam President Ho Chi Minh visited North Korea; North Korean prime minister Kim Il-sung visited North Vietnam in November–December 1958 and November 1964. In February 1961, the two governments concluded an agreement on scientific and technical cooperation. North Vietnam merged with South Vietnam in 1976 to become the modern country of Vietnam.

History

During the Vietnam War, North Korea provided substantial economic and military aid to North Vietnam (1966: 12.3 million rubles; 1967: 20 million; 1968: 12.5 million; 1969: 12.5 million). In 1968, approximately 2,000 Vietnamese students and trainees received education for free in Korea. As a result of a decision of the Korean Workers' Party in October 1966, in early 1967 North Korea sent a fighter squadron to North Vietnam to back up the North Vietnamese 921st and 923rd fighter squadrons defending Hanoi. They stayed through 1968; 200 pilots were reported to have served. In addition, at least two anti-aircraft artillery regiments were sent as well. North Korea also sent weapons, ammunition and two million sets of uniforms to their comrades in North Vietnam. Kim Il-sung is reported to have told his pilots to "fight in the war as if the Vietnamese sky were their own". 

From 1968, however, relations between Pyongyang and Hanoi started to deteriorate for various reasons. Anxious to keep the United States bogged down in Vietnam, North Korea disagreed with North Vietnam's decision to enter peace negotiations with the U.S., and reacted negatively to the Paris Peace Accords. During the Cambodian Civil War, North Korea approved the Chinese plan to create a "united front of the five revolutionary Asian countries" (China, Korea, Vietnam, Laos, and Cambodia), whereas North Vietnam rejected it on the grounds that such a front would exclude the Soviet Union and challenge Vietnamese dominance in Indochina. Around this time, the Vietnam War came to an end. The government of North Vietnam, unlike that of North Korea, succeeded in reunifying the whole country by 1975. During the Cambodian–Vietnamese War, the North Korean leadership condemned the Vietnamese invasion of Cambodia, refused to recognize the People's Republic of Kampuchea, and allowed the exiled Norodom Sihanouk to stay in Korea. North Korea also provided supports for the Khmer Rouge during that time, sided with China during the Sino-Vietnamese War, and also demanded Vietnam to be removed from the Non-Aligned Movement. According to historian Balazs Szalontai, Vietnam came to resent what it saw as North Korea's self-centred behaviour, and the two governments became rivals rather than friends. During the same time, Pol Pot, General Secretary of the Communist Party of Kampuchea and the leader of Khmer Rouge, managed to have a visit to North Korea, one of only two foreign trips led by Pol Pot, further strained North Korean–Vietnamese relations, as Pol Pot was a recognized enemy of Vietnam.

Early 2000s
In the 1990s and 2000s, North Korean-Vietnamese relations declined even more due to investment and trade disputes.

The former Vietnamese ambassador to South Korea is a graduate of North Korea's Kim Il-sung University. The son of a former staff member in the Vietnamese embassy in Pyongyang, who also attended Kim Il-sung University between 1998 and 2002, gave an interview in 2004 with South Korean newspaper The Chosun Ilbo about the experiences he had while living there. 

While its giant neighbor China is an obvious example of economic reform to follow, experts say Vietnam is seen as a far better model by North Korea.

Recent events
Kim Jong-un came to Vietnam on 26 February 2019 on a 60-hour train ride to attend the Hanoi Summit with U.S. President Donald Trump. He was greatly welcomed by the Vietnamese officials and made a visit to the North Korean Embassy in Hanoi. On March 1 and 2, Kim Jong-un made an official visit to Vietnam, 60 years after his grandfather's first visit to the country. He met the Vietnamese President and General Secretary Nguyễn Phú Trọng, Prime Minister Nguyễn Xuân Phúc and National Assembly Chairwoman Nguyễn Thị Kim Ngân. Both countries agreed on tightening diplomatic ties and economy, which was damaged by previous North Korean support to Khmer Rouge.

See also
 Koreans in Vietnam
 South Korea–Vietnam relations
 Vietnamese people in Korea

References

Vietnam
Bilateral relations of Vietnam
Korea–Vietnam relations